Paula Sanmartín Rodríguez (born 16 May 1997) is a Spanish former professional racing cyclist, who rode professionally between 2018 and 2020, for the ,  and  teams.

References

External links

1997 births
Living people
Spanish female cyclists
Place of birth missing (living people)
21st-century Spanish women